The Hassi Messaoud district is an Algerian administrative district in the Ouargla province.  Its chief town is located on the eponymous commune of Hassi Messaoud.

Communes 
The district is composed of only one commune: Hassi Messaoud.

References 

Districts of Tizi Ouzou Province